is a 2014 Japanese comic science fiction anime film produced by Shogakukan. It is the 22nd film of the popular comedy manga and anime series Crayon Shin-chan, released in Japanese theatres on 19 April 2014. It is directed by Wataru Takahashi and the script is written by Kazuki Nakashima of Kill la Kill. The story of the movie was published as manga in the October issue of Manga Town, with script written by Nakashima and art by Aiba Kenta. This film was nominated for the Japanese Media Arts Festival in the animation award category. The film was released in India on 24 October 2015 as Shin Chan Movie: Robot Dad on Hungama TV. The film was released in Indonesia on 17 August 2020 as Shinchan Gambar: Pertempuran Intens! Robo Dad Menyerang Kembali aired Spacetoon Is Company By Screenplay Films

Overview
This is the first time in the Crayon Shin-chan movie series that Shinnosuke's father is the main character. In this movie, Shinnosuke's father Hiroshi gets converted into a robot.
 When his father goes for a massage to fix his sprained back, he returns home as a robot, "with a snort more powerful than an electric fan!" In the year 2014, the "father revolution" breaks out throughout the land. In these troubled times, Robot dad along with Shinnosuke have to protect their family.

Plot
In the beginning, Shinnosuke and Hiroshi were watching the new Kantam Robot movie. It featured characters like Kantam Robot, his wife Sheila, their son Kantam Jr. and the mastermind Akogidesu. After watching the movie, they went out. They played sometime in the nearby park. There they met a middle-aged man named Susukita Osamu. Hiroshi gave Shinnosuke a ride on his shoulder. But then he gets a strained back. On their way home, they meet a mysterious lady called Omega Ranran who worked at a massage salon. She is characterised by large breasts, which Shinnosuke imitates to tease Hiroshi. She talks with them, offers Hiroshi a free massage. But only Hiroshi was allowed to go into the store. Hiroshi was forced to sleep by the lady, and was remodelled...

Later, Hiroshi woke up and his body felt better. Meanwhile, Shinnosuke was telling Misae and others about the lady's meeting with Hiroshi, and imitating the lady with large breasts. Hiroshi then arrived at home and met his family, who were surprised on seeing a robot. Misae said ”who are you?”. They could not believe their eyes at first, but finally Misae understood that the robot is Hiroshi. But she doesn't let him take into the house. Hiroshi had to sleep in Shiro's house. He realised that it had got to do something with the massage salon and the lady.

Next morning they went to the massage salon. But the salon was vanished. So Misae went to the Kasukabe Police Station. The chief Kuroiwa Jintaro ordered the police officer, Dandanbara Teruyo to find the lady massagist who had vanished. But they couldn't find.

Nohara family lived a few days with Robot Dad.

One day Himawari kindergarten had a school trip to a river side building under construction. Kasukabe Boueitai was forced to step up the elevator by a robot. But the top of elevator was nothing. So they jump up and hung on a reinforced concrete, swinging in the air. But the rope of reinforced concrete was cut off and they dropped into the air. They were in a dangerous situation. Then Robot Dad comes and saves them all.

With this, Nohara family accepted Robot Dad. While Misae was worried, Shinnosuke was overjoyed to have a Robot dad. The robot dad had a remote control by which he can be controlled. Robot dad turns out to be very handy. He did cooking for the family. He used his legs as grass cutters and hands as bush cutters, and did a wonderful job in gardening. He also repaired the TV antenna. He could do many things which human Hiroshi couldn't do. Shinnosuke used the remote to do him various actions, including the buriburi dance. When the energy of the Robot dad was over, he had to be refilled from a hole in the Robot's butt. Once Shinnosuke and Robot dad had an arm wrestling match. Shinnosuke was defeated easily at first, but the second time Robot dad let him win as he didn't want to upset a kid. Misae once says emotionally that "whether you are robot or human, you are a father, one of the best fathers". Once during dinner time, Himawari accidentally presses the two switches suggestive of the nipples, and two missiles were launched (but the house was not blown off as shown in the trailer, although it did cause damage).

Few days later, Shinnosuke met the lady, the same masseuse, and she gives him a moustache. After he came back home, during dinner Shinnosuke let Robot dad put on the moustache. Suddenly Robot dad changes totally. He becomes a tyrant and rules his family.

The next day Robot dad gathers all fathers in the park and drives out the tyranny mothers from the park. Then they march along the street, with banners in their hand. Seeing that the changed Robo Hiroshi is out of control, Shinnosuke thought of putting back the former Robot dad. So Kasukabe Defense Group lead him to the back alley and attacked him. Later, he was almost broken and trodden on by Tekkenji Doukatsu, the leader of the Father's Alliance. Robot Hiroshi was brought somewhere on the track, and Shinnosuke was chasing.

Then they arrived the factory, and Shinnosuke had only the head of Robot dad. Shinnosuke lost his way and found a huge room where there were many robots which looked the same type as Robot Hiroshi. So he put the Robo Dad's head to a cleaning robot that looked like a Roomba. Robot Hiroshi woke up and shouted ”What is this body!? Where is my body?”. They entered another room. They found the real Hiroshi, naked and sleeping in the water ball. Shinnosuke pushed a button, and human Hiroshi woke up. They both said "Who are you?!" and claimed to be the real Hiroshi. So Hiroshi and Robot dad quarrelled. Then they three were detected by Chichiyure Doumei (Father's union). Robot dad is actually a robot in which Hiroshi's memory had been copied, so that he behaved like real Hiroshi. Hiroshi had not turned into a robot in reality. Then Robot dad finds new body, and they escape. They had known that the factory was the river side building. So they went home.

The fathers had occupied the police station. So Robot dad and Nohara family went there. Tekkenji comes out and battles with Robot dad. After a serious battle, Robot dad wins and is pleased; he looks at misae. But Misae hugged Hiroshi the real human dad. Robot dad was disappointed.

Nohara family, Dandanbara and Robot dad were caught by Tekkenji. They discovered that Tekkenji's real identity is Kuroiwa Jintarou, the chief police officer. Tekkenji was a robot controlled by Jintarou. Jintarou ordered Dr. Ganma to delete Robot dad's the memory. He decided to give devilish treatment to Shinnosuke. Robot dad cooked large serving fried green peppers, and forced Shinnosuke to eat them. Shinnosuke looked afraid but eats it all with courage. He shouted "come back Robot dad!". Hearing this, Robot dad come back to his original sense. Tekkenji driven by Jintaro attacked them. The battle is fought once again. But the battle affects the building terribly and was breaking. They escaped and went outside.

Kuroiwa rode a new big robot named Itsuki Hiroshi (a famous singer)(which in itself a reference of the Coroette Robot Gag)). Then Robot dad changed into big Robot dad, an ultimate weapon made instantly by Robot dad while sucking all cranes, metal bars, into a field generated, so to piece them together to make an ultimate weapon. Shinnosuke and Hiroshi rode on it. Itsuki then launches a rocket towards big Robot dad's head, but it failed because big Robot dad's head can move sideways. Then Shinnosuke made big Robot dad launch the same rocket onto Itsuki, but no damage is made. Then, Dr. Ganma switched on the melting wave, which then made big Robot dad to melt.

After this, another fierce battle happened. Robot dad then gave Shinnosuke the remote control, telling him to do the 'old trick', to Hiroshi's confusion. robot dad went for the large oval-shaped building so to create another form. He made use of the shape to make a 'butt' . After it has done, Shinnosuke controlled Robot dad to do the 'buriburi dance' with the form. Itsuki escapes, and tries to use the melting wave but this time it failed, and ended up reflecting it onto Dandanbara, Misae and Omega. Then after a while, the 'butt' caught Itsuki, and was destroyed. They finally beat Itsuki robot.

After the victory, Robot dad said to Hiroshi "Which one is the real Hiroshi? Let's decide with arm wrestling." The final battle began. The battle was a heated one with both sides refusing to give up. In the end human Hiroshi beat Robot Hiroshi. It was decided that there can be only one Hiroshi. Robot dad said his last words, and Shinnosuke said that he will grow taller, taller than Itsuki robot. Then Robot dad appears to be smiling, and was broken. Shinnosuke missed Robot Dad.

Slogans
The movie's slogans are:
"Robot, but dad.."
"Father force, full throttle!"

Cast
 Akiko Yajima as Shinnosuke Nohara
 Keiji Fujiwara as Hiroshi Nohara、Robot Hiroshi
 Miki Narahashi as Misae Nohara
 Satomi Korogi as Himawari Nohara

Guest cast
 Korokke as Ganma Hakase
 Emi Takei as Dandanbara Teruyo

Characters specific to the movie

Robot Hiroshi (Robot dad)
It is the appearance of Nohara Hiroshi after getting converted into a robot by a mysterious organization with dubious beauty salon. Body is that the face is made of ivory, and his trademark beard has also been faithfully reproduced. In his chest, two switches which are suggestive of the nipples are attached. Fuel is marked with filler neck to the portion of oil in the butt, it can be injected from there.

Fighting Robot Dad
He is the Robot Dad "Stubborn Father Circuit" who was operated by the Father's alliance, after wearing parts made by them such as the beard, and there was a sudden change in his nature, a strict personality. The blue small tube had changed to red, and there were two red streaks on the face. The deformed switches suggestive of the nipples were wielded into two bamboo swords. Moreover, if beaten with the bamboo sword then from the contact portion, blue colored lightning runs.

Chichi Yure Doumei (The Association of Fathers)
It is the organization that envisaged the reinstatement of the father's position in the Japanese family which had become weak. The name stands for "Father, stand up with courage (Yuuki)".

Tekkenji Doukatsu
He is the man who formed the "Chichi Yure Doumei" in the sad situation where the dignity of the modern father is lost.

Omega Ranran
She is the only girl in the Father's Association. Characterised by large breasts, she is the mysterious lady who took Hiroshi to the este salon.
She is named after the Greek Letter Ω (Omega).

Dr. Ganma (Ganma Hakase)
He is a genius scientist belonging to a mysterious organization which made Hiroshi a robot. He has a world authority on Robotics. He is the parody character of Dr.Tenma of Astro Boy.
He is named after the Greek letter γ ( Gamma).

Down Kasukabe Police Station

Kuroiwa Jintarou
He is the chief of the Down Kasukabe Police Station. Twink in a little smug, he wears the shoes the shoes of false bottom. Moreover, he loves himself and always checks him in front of the mirror.

Dandanbara Teruyo
Age:19 (First appearance), 20 (Current) She is a woman police officer who was assigned under Kasukabe Police Station, but is a significant troublemaker. She has a dream of becoming a detective.

Others

Susukita Osamu
He is a middle-aged man whom Hiroshi met when he dropped by the park. He wears glasses and is a smoker.

Yamada John Seinen
He is the hero of Kantam Robot movie, and is the partner of Kantam Jr. He is 29 years old.

Kantam Jr.
He is the son of Kantam Robot and Sheila that appeared in the Kantam Robot movie. He is 17 years old.

Akogidesu
He is the mastermind villain of the Kantam Robot movie.

Theme songs

Opening theme song
 "Kimi ni 100 Percent" (Warner Music Japan) by Kyary Pamyu Pamyu

Ending theme song
 "Family Party" (Warner Music Japan) by Kyary Pamyu Pamyu

Reception
The film grossed a total of US$17,090,000 (JP¥1,820,000,000) in Japan.
 This was the fourth-largest grossing Crayon Shin-chan film in Japan as of 2015, and the second-largest grossing since the first two films in 1992 and 1993.

Home media
The DVD and Blu-ray was released on 7 November 2014, by Bandai Visual.

See also
 Crayon Shin-chan
 Yoshito Usui

References

Intense Battle! Robo Dad Strikes Back
2014 anime films
Toho animated films
2014 films